Great Britain competed at the 2015 World Aquatics Championships in Kazan, Russia between 24 July to 9 August 2015.

Tom Daley and Rebecca Gallantree became the first ever winners of the Mixed team event. In doing so, Daley became the first British diver to win multiple medals across World Championships, and the first British double world champion. Gallantree became the first female British diver to win a World Championship medal of any colour, and the first female British World Champion. With bronze in the Men's 10 m platform, Daley would go on to become the first British diver to win three World Championship medals.

Jack Laugher, with his bronze medal in both the Men's 3 m springboard event, and Men's 3 m synchronized springboard with Chris Mears, became the first British diver to win two World championship medals at one edition, later equalled by Daley. With a gold and three bronze medals, the 2015 edition was by some margin the most successful World Championships in diving for Great Britain since the championships began.

With Great Britain's first gold medal in Men's high diving, Gary Hunt brought the Great Britain overall tally to ten medals, the highest ever for the nation at a FINA World Aquatics Championships. Simultaneously, with his silver medal from 2013, Hunt became the most successful male high diver since the event was brought into the World Aquatics Championships.

Adam Peaty became the first British swimmer to ever win three gold medals at a global championships, Worlds or Olympic, with victories in the 50 metre and 100 metre breaststroke events and the 4 x 100 metre mixed medley relay. James Guy won the first ever gold medal in male freestyle for Great Britain at a World Championships in the 200 metres freestyle, and then anchored the Great Britain Men's 4 × 200 m freestyle relay team to its first ever victory in the event.

The bronze medal won by Jaz Carlin in the Women's 800 m freestyle brought the tally of swimming medals to five golds, a silver and three bronzes, at nine medals, the best return for Great Britain in the swimming portion of a World Aquatics Championships, having already achieved the best results in their history in diving and high diving. The full tally of seven golds, one silver and six bronze was also an historic high for the championships as a whole.

Medalists

Diving

British divers qualified for the individual spots and the synchronized teams at the World Championships. Nine divers have been nominated to the roster for Team GB at the Worlds, including 2012 Olympic bronze medalist Tom Daley.

Diving at the 2015 World Aquatics Championships was a qualification event for the 2016 Summer Olympics, and Great Britain, with a top three finish in the 3 m synchronized springboard for Jack Laugher and Chris Mears, achieved a quota place for a team at the Rio games. In the individual events, Tom Daley (10m platform) and Jack Laugher (3m springboard) both won bronze medals, and they, along with finalists Rebecca Gallantree (3 metre springboard) and Tonia Couch (10 metre platform), won a single quota place for Great Britain in each of the four individual diving events in Rio.

Men

Women

Mixed

High diving

Great Britain has qualified two high divers at the World Championships.

Open water swimming

Great Britain fielded a full team of seven swimmers to compete in the open water marathon.

Men

Women

Swimming

British swimmers have achieved qualifying standards in the following events (up to a maximum of 2 swimmers in each event at the A-standard entry time, and 1 at the B-standard): All British swimmers must qualify by finishing in the top two of the national championships, having gained the GB qualifying A standard set by British Swimming in the relevant final.

Great Britain consists of 30 swimmers (16 men and 14 women). Among the official roster featured European and Commonwealth Games champions Jazmin Carlin, Chris Walker-Hebborn, and Adam Peaty, who overhauled the 58-second barrier to set a new world record in the 100 m breaststroke at the national trials.

The championships were a qualification event for the relay races at the 2016 Summer Olympics, and Great Britain qualified for five of the six relays in Rio, the women's 4 x 100 freestyle being the exception, where they did not field a team in Kazan.

Great Britain's total of five golds and nine medals in the swimming pool are the best returns in golds and medals for Great Britain in the history of the Championships.

Men

Women

Mixed

Synchronized swimming

Great Britain has qualified two synchronized swimmers in the women's duet events.

References

External links
British Swimming Official Site

Nations at the 2015 World Aquatics Championships
2015 in British sport
Great Britain at the World Aquatics Championships